Karlsborg Artillery Corps may refer to:

Karlsborg Artillery Corps (No 9), a Swedish Army artillery corps from 1893 to 1901. It was reorganized into the Boden-Karlsborg Artillery Regiment in 1902.
Karlsborg Artillery Corps (A 10), a Swedish Army artillery corps from 1920 to 1927. It was reorganized into the Karlsborg Artillery Regiment in 1927

Artillery corps of the Swedish Army